Marker buoy may refer to:
 Surface marker buoy used by divers
 A floating sea mark
 A light- or smoke-emitting buoy used in naval warfare